Ulrikke Brandstorp (born 13 July 1995), known professionally as Ulrikke, is a Norwegian singer, songwriter, musical actress and voice actress.

Early life 
Ulrikke Brandstorp was born on 13 July 1995 in Skjeberg, a district of Sarpsborg, to Jørn and Vigdis Brandstorp, being the youngest of three children.

Her musical talents were first spotted when she won a local singing competition when she was eight, while she also participated in Villekula youth theatre in her native Østfold, starring in local productions of Pippi Longstocking and Reisen til julestjernen. Between 2011 and 2013, Brandstorp embarked on a Norwegian tour with The Show Must Go On and The Thrill of Michael Jackson.

Career 
Brandstorp made her national breakthrough when she participated in the seventh series of Idol in 2013, but was eliminated in the semi-finals.

She later participated in the third series of The Voice – Norges beste stemme in 2015, but was eliminated in the battle rounds.

She also participated in the first series of Maskorama in 2020, performing under the name "Troll" and winning the competition on 12 December.

Melodi Grand Prix 
Brandstorp participated in Melodi Grand Prix for the first time in 2017, finishing in fourth place in the final with "Places".

She returned to Melodi Grand Prix in 2020, with the song "Attention". Having been the odds-on favourite to win the competition, Brandstorp was selected as the Norwegian entry in the Eurovision Song Contest 2020 on 15 February, and was viewed as one of the favourites to win the contest outright in Rotterdam. However, the contest was cancelled on 18 March, due to the onset of the COVID-19 pandemic.

Brandstorp declined an offer of automatic qualification for the final of Melodi Grand Prix in 2021, citing a desire to find the right song for any potential return, and Tix was eventually chosen instead. She accepted an offer from NRK to return as a guest in the final, performing a new version of "Attention" as the opening act and her most recent release, "Falling Apart", during the interval.

Brandstorp participated in Melodi Grand Prix for a third time in 2023, with the song "Honestly". The song competed in the first semi-final on 14 January, and subsequently qualified for the final, which was held on 4 February. She would place second with 138 points, behind the winner Alessandra.

Acting 
Brandstorp was cast as Liesl von Trapp in the Norwegian production of The Sound of Music, which performed in Folketeateret in Oslo in 2019.

She was later cast as Sophie Sheridan in the Norwegian production of Mamma Mia!, which performed in Folketeateret in 2021.

Brandstorp was subsequently cast as the Norwegian voice of Mirabel Madrigal in the 2021 Disney fantasy comedy Encanto.

Personal life
Brandstorp has been in a relationship with Oskar Nordberg since April 2020, with Brandstorp writing the song "Love You to Love Me" as a declaration of her love for Nordberg.

The couple got engaged in May 2022.

Discography

Albums

Singles

References

External links 
 
 Ulrikke on Eurovision.tv

Living people
1995 births
Musicians from Sarpsborg
Norwegian songwriters
Norwegian pop singers
Idol (Norwegian TV series) participants
The Voice (franchise) contestants
Melodi Grand Prix contestants
Eurovision Song Contest entrants for Norway
Eurovision Song Contest entrants of 2020
21st-century Norwegian singers
21st-century Norwegian women singers
Melodi Grand Prix winners
Masked Singer winners